Sid Page is an American violinist who has been active in many genres of music since the late 1960s. He has been a member of Dan Hicks and His Hot Licks. From 1973 to 1974, he was a member of Sly and the Family Stone and appeared on their album Small Talk (1974).

Page has worked with Suzy Bogguss, Danny Elfman, Richard Elliot, Jerry Garcia, Mark Isham, James Newton Howard, Thomas Newman, Roy Orbison, Sam Phillips, Rod Stewart, John Tesh, Richard Thompson, and Suzanne Vega.

Film work
Page has contributed to the music of at least 29 films including The Moderns in 1988, Little Man Tate in 1991, and Cold Creek Manor in 2003. He has also been concertmaster of at least eight films, including Passed Away in 1992, Son in Law in 1993, and Duma in 2005.

References

External links
Official website

American male violinists
Living people
1947 births
21st-century American violinists
21st-century American male musicians